Valerio Rocco Orlando (born in 1978 in Milan, Italy) is an Italian artist, Professor of Multimedia Dramaturgy at Brera Academy in Milan and PhD candidate in Engineering-based Architecture and Urban Planning at Sapienza University of Rome.

His collaborations include working with French philosopher Jean-Luc Nancy, English composer Michael Nyman, artists Gilbert & George, Ugo Rondinone and Liam Gillick, jazz singer Amalia Grè, supermodel Eva Riccobono, actors Saleh Bakri, Alba Rohrwacher, and psychoanalyst Luigi Zoja.

Valerio Rocco Orlando has exhibited widely and represented Italy at the 11th Havana Biennial (2012). Recent solo institutional exhibitions include: The Reverse Grand Tour, Galleria Nazionale d'Arte Moderna e Contemporanea, Rome (2013); The Sphere of the Between, Korea Foundation, Seoul (2015); What Education for Mars?, Museo Marino Marini, Florence (2015); Portami al Confine, MUSMA, Matera (2016); Valerio Rocco Orlando, Santiago Museum of Contemporary Art, Santiago (2017); Dialogue with the Unseen, MUDEC Museo delle Culture, Milan (2019).

Thanks to the Ministry of Culture (Italy)’s support within the Italian Council program, in 2021 Valerio Rocco Orlando founded an independent and transdisciplinary school in the heart of UNESCO Heritage Sassi di Matera, in the South of Italy; he created a digital platform and started the restoration of a building granted to him by the city of Matera for thirty years (South of Imagination, 2021-ongoing). 

Orlando's works have been featured in Artforum, ArtReview, Contemporary (magazine), Corriere della Sera, Domus (magazine), Flash Art, Frieze (magazine), Il manifesto, La Repubblica, L'Uomo Vogue, Modern Painters (magazine), The Korea Herald, Vogue Italia and W magazine.

Artistic practice 
Since 2002 Valerio Rocco Orlando has worked on a number of community-based projects, creating different cycles of installations focused on the relationship between individual and collective identity. His first project (The Sentimental Glance, 2002-2007) is a seven-channel video installation built like a stratified Bildungsroman populated by the portraits of six young women on the threshold between childhood and adulthood, passion and loneliness, melancholy, maternity and androgyny. As art critic Caroline Corbetta has said,

"Emotions and beauty are the weapons of Valerio Rocco Orlando’s utopia. The erudite aesthetic component of his works is not a sterile exercise in style but a necessary instrument (revolutionary?) of communication and participation. In his case, beauty is the name of a particular interaction between two beings, a ‘Self’ and an ‘Other’... Beauty and emotion imply an idea of movement: interior but also towards the 'Other'. Though he rapidly shifted from cinematography to art, in reality Valerio Rocco Orlando has continued to “do” cinema in the etymological sense of the term: indeed, kinema means movement. Entering the space sketched out by one of his video installations implies not only the movement of vision, but also of bodies and emotivity".

Dealing with themes such as the relationship between artists and society (The Reverse Grand Tour, 2012), the feelings of newer generations towards folklore (Bisiàc, 2007), the exchanges between a couple (Lover’s Discourse, 2010) and within a school as an institution (What Education for Mars?, 2011-2013). Orlando carries out a personal exploration of portraiture, using the activities of meeting and dialogue as tools.  By defining art as a process of analysis and mutual knowledge, Valerio Rocco Orlando explores and tells everyday life stories, taken from personal and social context, recomposing them as the pieces of a mosaic within an image of the whole.

"In order to investigate a universal theme, Valerio Rocco Orlando thinks, builds, and weaves relationships with the other, in such a direct and essential way that the artist’s main medium become the encounter itself. Einfülhung, what German philosophers refer to as empathy, is both a prerequisite and a direct consequence of the methodology of Orlando. Conceiving the production as a long-term process based on trust and intimacy, the audience gets to feel the other, participating in his points of view and feelings, by mirroring and questioning their own experience. Only through this new exchange with the viewer the research is completed and the artwork can respond to its function of radical education".

Valerio Rocco Orlando's latest work (Dialogue with the Unseen, 2019) is a spiritual pilgrimage and a political journey to the Holy Land. Starting from a collaboration with Palestinian actor Saleh Bakri, this video installation is a collection of encounters between individuals who are questioning their own relationships with Nature and Society.

Academics and conferences 
Valerio Rocco Orlando gave lectures and workshops in some of the most renowned faculties and institutions worldwide, among others: Accademia di Belle Arti di Roma, Rome;  Accademia Carrara di Belle Arti di Bergamo, Bergamo; Accademia di Belle Arti, L'Aquila; Bezalel Academy of Arts and Design, Jerusalem; Bocconi University, Milan; Brera Academy, Milan; Dongduk Women's University, Seoul; Ewha Womans University, Seoul; Instituto Superior de Arte, Havana; International Studio & Curatorial Program (ISCP), New York City; Istituto Europeo di Design, Milan; IULM University of Milan, Milan; Kookmin University, Seoul; Korea Foundation, Seoul; MAXXI – National Museum of the 21st Century Arts, Rome; Musei Capitolini, Rome; Palazzo Strozzi, Florence; Parsons The New School for Design, New York City; Politecnico di Milano, Milan; The Valley School, Bangalore; Università Cattolica del Sacro Cuore, Milan.

Awards 
In 2009 Valerio Rocco Orlando won the ISCP New York Prize promoted by Parc/Seat/Gai. In 2011 he was awarded a Civitella Ranieri Foundation Visual Arts Fellowship and in 2014 he received an International Artist Fellowship at the MMCA National Museum of Modern and Contemporary Art Korea. In 2016 the artist won the VII VAF Foundation Art Prize and his work was acquired for the permanent collection of the Museum of Modern and Contemporary Art of Trento and Rovereto.

Public collections 
 A. M. Qattan Foundation, Ramallah
 Centro de Arte Contemporáneo Wifredo Lam, Havana
 Centro per l'arte contemporanea Luigi Pecci, Prato
 Fundação Calouste Gulbenkian, Lisbon
 Galleria Nazionale d'Arte Moderna e Contemporanea, Rome
 Museo MAGA, Gallarate
 Museo del Novecento, Milan
 Museo Irene Brin, Bordighera
 Museum of Modern and Contemporary Art of Trento and Rovereto, Rovereto
 Museum of Contemporary Art of Rome, Rome
 MUSMA Museo della Scultura Contemporanea Matera, Matera
 Panza Collection, Varese
 Villa Reale, Monza

Bibliography 
 Portami al Confine, Silvana Editoriale, Cinisello Balsamo 2021. 
 Uno alla volta. Comunità e Partecipazione, Postmedia Books, Milan 2020. 
 What Education for Mars?, Museo Marino Marini, Florence 2016. 
 The Sphere of the Between, Korea Foundation, Seoul 2015. 
 The Reverse Grand Tour, Galleria Nazionale d'Arte Moderna e Contemporanea, Rome 2013. 
 Oncena Bienal de La Habana. Prácticas Artísticas e Imaginarios Sociales, Maretti, Rome 2012. 
 New Italian Art. L'arte contemporanea delle ultime generazioni, Castelvecchi, Rome 2012. 
 Common life. Images for community of citizens, Electa Mondandori, Milan 2012. 
 Neon. La materia luminosa dell'arte, MACRO Quodlibet, Rome 2012. 
 Endless, Mousse Publishing, Milan 2011.

References

External links 
 Valerio Rocco Orlando's official website
 South of Imagination's official website
 
 
 Valerio Rocco Orlando at MUDEC Museo delle Culture, Milan
 Valerio Rocco Orlando at MMCA National Museum of Modern and Contemporary Art Korea, Seoul
 Valerio Rocco Orlando, The Reverse Grand Tour. AUP | e-flux, New York
 The Inclusion Interviews Valerio Rocco Orlando, 2 May 2013. The Inclusion, David Roberts Art Foundation, London

1978 births
Italian contemporary artists
Living people
Artists from Milan
Academic staff of Brera Academy